St Denis's Church, Otterham is a  Grade II* listed parish church in the Church of England Diocese of Truro in Otterham, Cornwall.

History
The dedication to St. Denis is undocumented according to Charles G. Henderson who observes that nearby land was called St Tenye in 1613. (Other dedications to this saint in Cornwall are found at Trevena and North Tamerton.)

The church dates from the Norman period. The tower may have been rebuilt in 1702. The church was restored between 1889 and 1904; at which time the north transept was demolished and much old woodwork was removed.

Parish status

The church is in the Boscastle and Tintagel group of parishes which includes

St Symphorian's Church, Forrabury
St Merteriana's Church, Minster
St Materiana's Church, Tintagel
St Michael and All Angel's Church, Lesnewth
St Julitta's Church, St Juliot
The Holy Family Church, Treknow
St Piran's Church, Trethevy
St Petroc's Church, Trevalga

Bells & organ

The original 3 bells have been augmented to a peal of 6. The church used to have a harmonium, but the music is now played by an electric organ at the far right front of the church.

References

Otterham
Otterham
Grade II* listed buildings in Cornwall
National Heritage List for England
Buildings and structures in Cornwall